Mohamad Najir Husen, popularly known as Najir Husen, is a Nepalese film actor, known for his work in the Nepalese entertainment industry. One of the most critically acclaimed actors in Nepal, Husen began his career in acting at the Mandala Theater, Nepal. He received fame for his role in Hostel Returns as Rameshwor Yadav and Bikram in Bir Bikram 2.  Husen has also starred in many music videos as well.

Career
He was born on 7 September 1990 in Dumbarwana, Bara District, Nepal.

Theater and the beginning
Husen initially came to Kathmandu to pursue his studies and improve his dancing skills. He joined a contemporary ballet class in Kathmandu. His teacher found him expressive and suggested him to join an acting class. Najir then joined as a trainee in Mandala Theater Nepal in Kathmandu. His first theatre drama was Charandas Chor, where he had a small role; he received a lead role in the drama "Buddha Baani".

Husen got his film break as "Helmet Guy" in Priyanka Karki and Samyam Puri starred Punte Parade. The film was not commercially successful and thus Najir did not get much recognition.

Hostel returns and success
Husen played the role of Rameshwor Yadav in Hostel Returns. His role and acting was publicly acclaimed, and he became popular overnight. He then acted in successful movies like Junge, Bir Bikram and its sequel Bir Bikram 2 and critically acclaimed drama Gaatho.

Filmography

Awards & Nominations

References

21st-century Nepalese male actors
Living people
Nepalese male film actors
1990 births
Nepalese Muslims
People from Bara District